Xu Yulan (born Wang Yulan, December 27, 1921 – April 19, 2017) was a Yue opera singer-actress who plays Sheng roles (all male characters).

Early life
Xu Yulan was born in Zhejiang province (the location of present-day Xindeng township, Fuyang District). She trained in traditional Chinese opera, which included training in acrobatics and martial arts, at Dong'an Theatre School.

Career

Xu Yulan often played male roles in all-female Yue opera productions, and the "Xu style" of playing these xiaosheng (young male) roles is named for her. She co-starred with Wang Wenjuan for many years beginning in 1948, and commissioned works from other composers. In 1949 she was one of the performers required to take classes and pursue research on folk opera for the Shanghai government. In 1952 she won first prize in the first Chinese folk opera festival organized under the new Ministry of Culture. In 1953 she performed opera for Chinese and Korean military audiences, for which she was awarded a medal by the Korean Workers' Party. For much of her life she was an instructor, consultant, and advisor to the Shanghai Yue Opera Academy, and performed with the Academy's opera company on overseas tours to East Germany, the Soviet Union, Vietnam, and North Korea.

Xu Yulan's performances were preserved on film, including in The Carp Fairy (1959) and Dream of the Red Chamber (also known as A Dream of Red Mansions) (1962, directed by Cen Fan), the latter enormously successful with Chinese audiences when it was shown in 1978.  She also produced a television series of her career highlights. With the loosening of restrictions on artists in China, she formed the Red Mansions Opera Company, and was a popular guest at concerts in Singapore, Hong Kong, Taiwan, and Thailand. Late in life she was on the executive committee of the Chinese Dramatists' Association.

Personal life
Xu Yulan lived with her chaperone and personal assistant Zhao Naixue from 1946 until she married in 1954.

References

External links
 1962 film of Xu Yulan in Dream of the Red Chamber, with discussion, at the University of Minnesota's Dream of the Red Chamber: Afterlives project.
 

1921 births
2017 deaths
Yue opera actresses
Musicians from Hangzhou
Singers from Zhejiang
Chinese film actresses
Actresses from Hangzhou
20th-century Chinese actresses
Male impersonators in Yue opera
20th-century Chinese women singers